Line 30 is a Luxembourgian railway line connecting Luxembourg City to Wasserbillig, where it runs on the Trier West Railway, connecting to Trier in western Germany. The terminus at the western end is Luxembourg railway station. It is designated and predominantly operated by Chemins de Fer Luxembourgeois.

Stations
 Luxembourg
 Cents-Hamm
 Sandweiler-Contern
 Oetrange
 Munsbach
 Roodt
 Betzdorf
 Wecker
 Manternach
 Mertert
 Wasserbillig
 Trier (Germany)
 Schweich (Germany)

Railway lines in Luxembourg